Amokura railway station was a station on the North Island Main Trunk in the Waikato region of New Zealand,  from Wellington. It is at the north end of a  single line section extending to Te Kauwhata. Doubling of that section is being investigated in a business case from July 2021.

Sources differ as to the opening date. One says opening was on 20 October 1929 for goods and 11 November 1929 for passengers. Another says 13 August 1877 and that the line was doubled from 1 July 1956.  A siding was gazetted with the name Amokura in January 1929 and a 1930 article implied it was new. It was also known 1929 as Ngatikoi or Raumoa. A crossing loop was closed on 13 May 1963. at that time there was a proposal to combine it with Meremere station, as they were only a chain apart and Meremere was larger and better known.

References

External links 

 1960 photo of sidings at power station
 2014 photo of the start of the single track section at Amokura

Defunct railway stations in New Zealand
Rail transport in Waikato
Buildings and structures in Waikato
Waikato District
Railway stations opened in 1877
Railway stations closed in 1980
1877 establishments in New Zealand